Dániel Márk Horváth (born 5 March 1996) is a Hungarian footballer. He plays for Ajka.

International career
He was also part of the Hungarian U-20 team at the 2015 FIFA U-20 World Cup.

References

1996 births
Sportspeople from Győr
Living people
Hungarian footballers
Hungary youth international footballers
Hungary under-21 international footballers
Association football goalkeepers
Győri ETO FC players
Kozármisleny SE footballers
Csákvári TK players
FC Ajka players
Nemzeti Bajnokság I players
Nemzeti Bajnokság II players
21st-century Hungarian people